Iran has participated in the Turkvision Song Contest twice since its debut at the Turkvision Song Contest 2014 held in Kazan, Tatarstan, Russia. Iranian broadcaster Islamic Republic of Iran Broadcasting (IRIB) was the organiser of their debut entry.

History
The Iranians announced on 13 October 2014 that they would be making their debut at the Turkvision Song Contest 2014, in Kazan, Tatarstan.  Iran has previously participated in both the ABU TV Song Festival and ABU Radio Song Festival.  This was the first time that Iran have entered into a competitive contest.

Iran was represented by the band Barış Grubu. In Kazan they sang "Heydər Baba", Iran performed ninth in the semi final and qualified for the final in ninth with 178 points, in the final they performed fifth and finished thirteenth with 167 points. Afterwards, the band was reportedly banned from performing in Iran, due to issues regarding Iranian Azerbaijan and the promotion of Pan-Turkism in Iran.

Participation overview

See also 
 Iran in the ABU Radio Song Festival
 Iran in the ABU TV Song Festival

References 

Turkvision
Countries in the Turkvision Song Contest